The 2013 United States Senate special election in Massachusetts was held on June 25, 2013, in order to fill the Massachusetts Class 2 United States Senate seat for the remainder of the term ending January 3, 2015.

The vacancy that prompted the special election was created by the resignation of Senator John Kerry, in order to become U.S. Secretary of State. On January 30, 2013, Governor Deval Patrick chose his former chief of staff, Mo Cowan, to serve as interim U.S. Senator. Cowan declined to participate in the election. A party primary election was held on April 30, to determinate the nominees of each party for the general election. The Massachusetts Democrats nominated U.S. Representative Ed Markey, while the Massachusetts Republicans nominated Gabriel E. Gomez, a businessman and former Navy SEAL.

The race drew remarks from the media, because of its potential similarity to the 2010 special election, when Republican state senator Scott Brown upset the Democratic nominee, Massachusetts Attorney General Martha Coakley. However, Gomez trailed Markey in every opinion poll taken, and Markey defeated him by a 10.2 percentage point margin, despite low turnout.

Background 
The incumbent senator, John Kerry (Democratic), was nominated to serve as U.S. Secretary of State by President Barack Obama on December 21, 2012. He was confirmed by the Senate on January 29, 2013, and in a letter to Massachusetts Governor Deval Patrick, Kerry announced his resignation from the Senate, effective February 1. Kerry was sworn in as secretary of state on the same day.

Patrick's former chief of staff, Mo Cowan, was appointed to replace Kerry in the Senate on the same day, and immediately ruled himself out of the special election. The special primary elections took place on April 30. Democratic U.S. Representative Ed Markey and Republican businessman Gabriel E. Gomez won their respective primaries.

Democratic primary 
U.S. Representatives Ed Markey and Stephen F. Lynch both announced campaigns for the open seat. Markey was perceived as more left-wing than Lynch.

Candidates 
 Stephen F. Lynch, U.S. representative from South Boston
 Ed Markey, U.S. representative from Malden

Declined 
 Ben Affleck, actor
 Michael Capuano, U.S. representative, 2010 Democratic candidate for U.S. Senate
 Martha Coakley, Attorney General of Massachusetts and nominee for the U.S. Senate in 2010
 Mo Cowan, appointed incumbent U.S. senator
 Benjamin Downing, state senator
 Kimberly Driscoll, mayor of Salem
 Barney Frank, former U.S. representative
 Edward M. Kennedy, Jr., entrepreneur, investment banker, lawyer, and son of senator Ted Kennedy
 Victoria Reggie Kennedy, widow of senator Ted Kennedy
 Gerard Leone, Middlesex County District Attorney
 Jim McGovern, U.S. representative
 Marty Meehan, chancellor of the University of Massachusetts, Lowell and former U.S. Representative
 Carmen Ortiz, U.S. Attorney for the District of Massachusetts
 Deval Patrick, governor of Massachusetts
 Jonah Pesner, rabbi
 Niki Tsongas, U.S. representative and widow of senator Paul Tsongas

Debates 
 Complete video of debate, March 27, 2013 - C-SPAN
 Complete video of debate, April 22, 2013 - C-SPAN

Endorsements

Polling

Results

Republican primary

Candidates 
 Gabriel E. Gomez, businessman and former Navy SEAL
 Michael J. Sullivan, former United States Attorney for the District of Massachusetts and former Acting Director of the Bureau of Alcohol, Tobacco, Firearms and Explosives
 Daniel Winslow, State Representative

Withdrawn 
 Sean Bielat, nominee for Massachusetts's 4th congressional district in 2010 and 2012
 Jon Fetherston, former Ashland Selectman

Declined 
 Keith Ablow, psychiatrist and Fox News contributor
 Charlie Baker, former state cabinet secretary and nominee for Governor of Massachusetts in 2010
 Scott Brown, former U.S. Senator
 Lew Evangelidis, sheriff of Worcester County
 Kerry Healey, former lieutenant governor and nominee for governor in 2006
 Joe Malone, former Treasurer and Receiver-General of Massachusetts
 Ann Romney, former First Lady of Massachusetts
 Tagg Romney, businessman and son of former Governor Mitt Romney
 Jane Swift, former lieutenant governor and acting governor
 Bruce Tarr, State Senate Minority Leader
 Richard Tisei, former State Senate Minority Leader
 William Weld, former Governor of Massachusetts and nominee for the U.S. Senate in 1996

Debates 
 Complete video of debate, March 27, 2013 - C-SPAN

Endorsements

Polling

Results

General election

Candidates 
 Gabriel E. Gomez (Republican), businessman and former Navy SEAL
 Richard A. Heos (Twelve Visions Party)
 Ed Markey (Democratic), U.S. Representative from Massachusetts's 5th congressional district

Withdrawn 
 Daniel Fishman (Libertarian), former teacher and nominee for Massachusetts's 6th congressional district in 2012
 Jack E. Robinson III (Independent), businessman and perennial Republican candidate

Debates 
 Complete video of debate, June 5, 2013 - C-SPAN
 Complete video of debate, June 18, 2013 - C-SPAN

Fundraising

Top contributors

Top industries

Polling 

With Markey

With Lynch

With Brown

With Weld

Results

References

External links 
 Gabriel Gomez for U.S. Senate
 Stephen Lynch for Senate
 Ed Markey for Senate
 Michael Sullivan for Senate
 Daniel Winslow for Senate
 Campaign finance at OpenSecrets
 Collected news and commentary at The Boston Globe
 Collected news and commentary at the Boston Herald

2013
United States Senate
Massachusetts
Massachusetts 2013
Massachusetts 2013
United States Senate 2013